Doctor Decherd (foaled March 23, 2003) is a thoroughbred horse. He was a contender for the Triple Crown of Thoroughbred Racing in 2006. Doctor Decherd was on the Derby trail in 2006, and ran against Barbaro in the Holy Bull stakes (click the Holy Bull video), won the Aventura Stakes ridden by Jockey Shaun Bridgmohan and had dropped down into the 4K claiming ranks in the spring of 2008. Because of the proactive approach to this horse's trainer, by Friends Of Barbaro Linda & Patty, to offer a retirement home for Doctor Decherd - he was retired from the track in September 2008 and brought to Texas for rehab and retraining into a second career. Doctor Decherd has sponsors amongst the Friends Of Barbaro all over the country (and Canada), who contribute to his upkeep and all "own" a little piece this horse.

Connections
Doctor Decherd is owned by Mike McCarty and was trained by Steve Asmussen. In all of his lifetime starts he has been ridden by Shaun Bridgmohan or Roman Chapa. Doctor Decherd was bred in Kentucky by Calumet Farm.

Pedigree

References

2003 racehorse births
Thoroughbred family 4-m
Racehorses bred in Kentucky
Racehorses trained in the United States